The 2022–23 UEFA Women's Champions League knockout phase will start on 21 March 2023 with the quarter-finals and end with the final on 4 June 2023 at the Philips Stadion in Eindhoven, Netherlands, to decide the champions of the 2022–23 UEFA Women's Champions League.

Schedule
The schedule of the competition was as follows (all draws were held at the UEFA headquarters in Nyon, Switzerland).

Qualified teams
The knockout phase involves the eight teams which qualified as winners and runners-up of each of the four groups in the group stage.

Bracket

Quarter-finals

The draw for the quarter-finals was held on 10 February 2023.

Summary

The first legs will be played on 21 and 22 March, and the second legs on 29 and 30 March 2023.

|}

Matches

Semi-finals

The draw for the semi-finals was held on 10 February 2023 (after the quarter-final draw).

Summary

The first legs will be played on 22 and 23 April, and the second legs on 29 and 30 April 2023.

|}

Matches

Final

The final will be played in June 2023 at Philips Stadion, Eindhoven. A draw was held on 10 February 2023 (after the quarter-final and semi-final draws), to determine which semi-final winner will be designated as the "home" team for administrative purposes.

References

External links

UEFA Women's Champions League Matches: 2022–23, UEFA.com

2
March 2023 sports events in Europe
April 2023 sports events in Europe
May 2023 sports events in Europe
June 2023 sports events in Europe